Sergerio Montez "Teddy" Gipson (born February 15, 1980) is an American professional basketball player who last played for Donar of the Dutch Basketball League (DBL).

Professional career
Gipson started his professional career in 2003 with MyGuide Amsterdam in the Dutch Eredivisie, where he played three seasons. He won the Dutch championship in his debut season.

He signed with Paderborn Baskets of the German second division ProA for the 2006–07 season.

After one season, he returned to Amsterdam to play another two seasons there. In these two seasons, Amsterdam won the Eredivisie both times. On June 1, 2008, Gipson scored 27 points in Game 7 of the Finals, as the 77–72 win over Den Bosch which delivered Amsterdam the title.

In the 2012–13 season, Gipson played with Brose Baskets of the German League and the Euroleague.  He left Brose in February 2013 after some dissatisfaction with his role on the team. Later that month he signed with Limoges CSP in France. In November 2013, he signed with Igokea. In November 2014, he moved to Hungary and signed with Szolnoki Olaj for the 2014–15 season.

On January 9, 2016, he returned to Igokea. On March 14, 2016, he left Igokea and signed with French club STB Le Havre for the rest of the season.

On July 22, 2016, Gipson signed with SOMB of the French second tier Pro B.

On October 19, 2017, Gipson signed a two-month contract with Donar of the Dutch Basketball League (DBL) to replace the injured Arvin Slagter. On December 22, 2017, Donar announced Gipson would play for the team for the remainder of the 2017–18 season. In May 2018, Gipson won his fourth Dutch League championship with Donar. On July 30, 2018, Donar announced Gipson re-signed for another season.

Career statistics

EuroLeague

|-
| style="text-align:left;"| 2012–13
| style="text-align:left;"  | Brose Baskets
| 16 ||  10 || 20.3  || .368 || .455 || .632 || 1.4 || 2.1 || 0.4 || 0.1 || 7.6 ||  4.3
|-class="sortbottom"
| colspan=2 align=center | Career || 16 || 10 ||  20.3 || .368 || .455 || .632 || 1.4 || 2.1 || 0.4 || 0.1 || 7.6 ||  4.3
|-

References

External links

 LNB Pro B profile
 Teddy Gipson at eurobasket.com
 Teddy Gipson at euroleague.net
 Teddy Gipson at fiba.com

1980 births
Living people
ABA League players
Amsterdam Basketball players
African-American basketball players
American expatriate basketball people in Bosnia and Herzegovina
American expatriate basketball people in France
American expatriate basketball people in Germany
American expatriate basketball people in Hungary
American expatriate basketball people in the Netherlands
American men's basketball players
Arkansas Razorbacks men's basketball players
Basketball players from Louisiana
Big3 players
Brose Bamberg players
Donar (basketball club) players
Heroes Den Bosch players
Élan Béarnais players
KK Igokea players
Limoges CSP players
Paderborn Baskets players
Point guards
Shooting guards
SOMB Boulogne-sur-Mer players
Sportspeople from Monroe, Louisiana
STB Le Havre players
Szolnoki Olaj KK players
21st-century African-American sportspeople
20th-century African-American people
American men's 3x3 basketball players